Heritage Bank Center is an indoor arena located in downtown Cincinnati, next to the Great American Ball Park. It was completed in September 1975 and named Riverfront Coliseum because of its placement next to Riverfront Stadium. In 1997, the facility became known as The Crown, and in 1999, it changed its name again to Firstar Center after Firstar Bank assumed naming rights. In 2002, following Firstar's merger with U.S. Bank, the arena took on the name U.S. Bank Arena and kept that name until 2019.

The arena underwent a $14 million renovation project in 1997. The current main tenant is the Cincinnati Cyclones of the ECHL.

History
The arena was the home of the Cincinnati Stingers of the World Hockey Association from 1975 to 1979. Since then, the arena has hosted two minor league hockey teams and various concerts, political rallies, tennis tournaments, figure skating, professional wrestling, traveling circus and rodeo shows, and other events. The facility's longest-serving tenant was the Cincinnati Bearcats men's basketball program of the University of Cincinnati, who used the arena from its construction until 1987, when the team moved to Cincinnati Gardens and eventually to the on-campus Fifth Third Arena.

Until the opening of Fifth Third Arena at the University of Cincinnati and BB&T Arena at Northern Kentucky University, commencement ceremonies for both schools were held at Heritage Bank Center. On occasion, there have been local pushes for the attraction of another major sports franchise to occupy the arena, possibly a National Basketball Association (NBA) or National Hockey League (NHL) franchise. The Cincinnati Royals moved to Kansas City – Omaha in 1972, and were the last NBA team to call Cincinnati home. The NBA Cleveland Cavaliers have played preseason games at Heritage Bank Center.

In August 2019, it was announced that U.S. Bank would not be renewing its naming rights sponsorship of the arena, which had been in effect since 2002. Kentucky-based Heritage Bank assumed naming rights of the arena on November 4, 2019.

Owners
 Brian and Albert Heekin (1975–1997)
 Cincinnati Entertainment Associates (1997–2001)
 Nederlander Entertainment (2001–present)
 Anschutz Entertainment Group (2011–present)

Renovations
The arena was renovated in 1997 as part of the facility's purchase that year by a group headed by Doug Kirchhofer, owner of the Cincinnati Cyclones. The renovation cost $14 million and included new seating, improved concourses and restrooms, expanded concession areas, and a new center-hanging video board. As part of the renovation, the building was renamed "The Crown" and the Cyclones, who then played in the International Hockey League, moved from the Cincinnati Gardens.

A $200 million renovation was proposed in 2015 by arena owners Nederlander Entertainment and AEG Facilities. The renovations would include both upgrades to the seating and expansion to increase capacity to 18,500 seats, additional luxury suites and other premium seating, a new exterior facade, new video boards, and a renovation of the exterior concourse. 
The push for extensive renovations and upgrades came in 2014 after the city ran a bid for the 2016 Republican National Convention, which was unsuccessful due to the lack of adequate hotel rooms and infrastructure in the proximity of the Arena.

In 2017, Nederlander Entertainment announced its intention to tear down and replace the arena if a deal could be made with taxpayers, citing inadequate space and dated '70s aesthetics. This plan came after the Arena was awarded to be a site for the 2022 NCAA Division I men's basketball tournament, contingent upon updates to the venue. However, after little progress was made the NCAA decided in late 2019 to move the site of the games to Indianapolis.

Sporting events

Basketball
The Kentucky Colonels of the American Basketball Association played 14 games at the newly opened arena for their 1975–1976 season before the team folded due to the ABA–NBA merger following the season.

Cincinnati Bearcats men's basketball utilized Riverfront Coliseum as their home court from 1976 to 1987. During the Bearcats' tenancy the venue hosted the 1978 and 1983 Metro Conference men's basketball tournament.

Additional conference tournaments hosted here was the finals of the 1981 and the entire 1992 Midwestern Collegiate Conference men's basketball tournament as well as the 2005 and 2006 Atlantic 10 men's basketball tournament. In these instances, Xavier served as the host for the conference tournaments.

The 2002 and 2004 Conference USA men's basketball tournament were also hosted at the venue, in these instances with Cincinnati serving as the host for the conference tournaments.

The arena was the site of the Regional of the 1979 NCAA Men's Division I Basketball Tournament and 1987 NCAA Men's Division I Basketball Tournament, as well as a first and second round site for the 1988 NCAA Men's Division I Basketball Tournament and the 1992 NCAA Men's Division I Basketball Tournament. The arena was also host to the 1997 NCAA Division I women's basketball tournament Final Four.

In the aftermath of the 2011 Crosstown Shootout brawl, Cincinnati and Xavier agreed to move the Crosstown Shootout to the arena for the next two seasons. After the 2013 game, the Shootout returned to being played on campus.

Regular season college basketball games
This table does not include regular season games played by Cincinnati, when the team utilized Riverfront Coliseum as their home court from 1976 to 1987.

Source

Hockey

The first tenant of the arena was the Cincinnati Stingers franchise, which existed from 1975 to 1979 as an expansion team of the World Hockey Association. Despite moderate success, the Stingers did not survive the NHL–WHA merger in 1979 and the team ceased operations. A handful of minor league hockey franchises have called the arena home, with the most successful and longest standing being the Cincinnati Cyclones. As of 2020, the Cyclones are the only active tenant of the venue.

The arena has played host to a handful of college hockey events, including the 1996 NCAA Division I Men's Ice Hockey Tournament Frozen Four, which was won by Michigan. The site also hosted the regional games for the 2014, 2016, and 2017 NCAA Division I Men's Ice Hockey Tournament. In each instance, Miami (OH) served as the host for the regional games.

Concerts
The first entertainment event (opening night) to be staged at the facility was a rock concert by The Allman Brothers Band and special guest Muddy Waters on the Win, Lose Or Draw Tour on September 9, 1975, attended by 16,721 persons.

On June 25, 1977, Elvis Presley gave his second-to-last concert in the Riverfront Coliseum; 17,140 persons attended the concert.

In 1979, The Bee Gees played two sold-out shows there during their Spirits Having Flown Tour.

On March 28, 2010, then country star Taylor Swift performed a sold out show in this venue during her Fearless Tour.

On October 22, 2019, musical duo Twenty One Pilots performed as part of their Bandito Fall Tour 2019.

On October 24, 2019, Canadian singer Celine Dion performed as part of her Courage World Tour.  She had performed there previously when the facility was named "The Crown" as part of her Let's Talk About Love Tour on 9/19/1998. 

Other shows there have included The Eagles, Elton John, Gospel performing artist Ron Kenoly and several performances of Handel's Messiah.

1979 The Who concert deaths

On December 3, 1979, 11 teenagers and young adults were killed by compressive asphyxia and 26 other people were injured in a rush for seating at the opening of a sold-out rock concert by the English rock band The Who. On that evening, there were a total of 18,348 ticketed fans attending, which included 14,770 in general admission seats. The concert was using festival seating, where seats are available on a first-come, first-served basis. When the waiting fans outside the Coliseum heard the band performing a late sound check, they thought that the concert was beginning and tried to rush into the still-closed doors. Some at the front of the crowd were either trampled or squeezed to death standing up as those pushing from behind were unaware that the doors were still closed. Only a few doors were in operation that night, and there are reports that management did not open more doors due to union restrictions and the concern of people gate-crashing the ticket turnstiles.

As a result, the remaining concerts of 1979, Blue Öyster Cult on December 14 and Aerosmith on December 21, were canceled and concert venues across North America switched to reserved seating or changed their rules about festival seating. Cincinnati immediately outlawed festival seating at concerts. After establishment of a crowd control task force by Cincinnati mayor Ken Blackwell, the first concert held at the facility after the tragedy was ZZ Top with the Rockets on March 21, 1980, on ZZ Top's Expect No Quarter Tour.

On August 4, 2004, the Cincinnati City Council unanimously overturned the ban because it placed the city at a disadvantage for booking concerts. Many music acts prefer festival seating because it can allow the most enthusiastic fans to get near the stage and generate excitement for the rest of the crowd. The city had previously made a one-time exception to the ban, allowing festival seating for a Bruce Springsteen concert on November 12, 2002. Cincinnati was, for a time, the only city in the United States to outlaw festival seating altogether.

Other events
In 1987, the facility hosted the World Figure Skating Championships.

The arena hosted two major professional wrestling pay-per-view events: WCW's Souled Out in 2000 and WWE's Cyber Sunday in 2006.

UFC 77 was held at the arena on October 20, 2007, and was headlined by local fighter Rich Franklin. The UFC returned to the arena for the second time on May 10, 2014, with UFC Fight Night: Brown vs. Silva. The Strikeforce World Grand Prix: Barnett vs. Kharitonov event was held at the arena on September 10, 2011.

The arena hosted the opening and closing ceremonies to the 2012 World Choir Games that were held in Cincinnati.

In 2016, the arena hosted the Kellogg's Tour of Gymnastics Champions.

On August 1, 2019, the arena was the location of a rally held by then-President Donald Trump.

See also
 WKRP in Cincinnati February 11, 1980, episode "In Concert"

References

External links
 
 Concert listings at CincyMusic

1975 establishments in Ohio
1981 Davis Cup
Anschutz Corporation
Basketball venues in Ohio
Cincinnati Bearcats basketball venues
Cincinnati Cyclones
Cincinnati Rockers
Cincinnati Stingers
Cincinnati Tigers (ice hockey)
College basketball venues in the United States
College ice hockey venues in the United States
Gymnastics venues in the United States
Indoor arenas in Ohio
Indoor ice hockey venues in Ohio
Indoor soccer venues in Ohio
Mixed martial arts venues in the United States
Music venues in Cincinnati
Rock music venues
Sports venues completed in 1975
Sports venues in Cincinnati
U.S. Bancorp
World Hockey Association venues